Albina is a commune in Cimișlia District, Moldova. It is composed of three villages: Albina, Fetița and Mereni.

References

Communes of Cimișlia District